James Frazier  ACS (26 November 1940 – 17 September 2022) was an Australian inventor, naturalist and cinematographer who invented the Frazier lens. He won many Australian and international awards for his work, including an Academy Award for Technical Achievement and an Emmy Award. He is known for filming documentaries for David Attenborough together with his long-time collaborator Australian naturalist, photographer and writer Densey Clyne.

Clyne and Frazier formed a partnership known as Mantis Wildlife Films and their work including Webs of Intrigue, has won numerous international awards.  David Attenborough asked the pair to work on his series Life on Earth, The Living Planet and The Trials of Life. Frazier and Clyne contributed 55 minutes of footage to Life on Earth.

Frazier's career as a wildlife cinematographer spread over more than 40 years, with an Emmy, 3 Golden Tripods, a US Industrial Film & Video Gold Camera Award, an Honorary Science Doctorate and over 40 national and international awards for his work that include the acclaimed Cane Toads: An Unnatural History.

Frazier was awarded the Medal of the Order of Australia in the 1995 Queen's Birthday Honours List for "service to wildlife cinematography".

He was winner of a Technical Oscar in 1997 for his invention of the Frazier lens System, which has revolutionised the international film industry, an ingenious lens that provides an extended depth of field and an ability to have both the foreground and background in focus. The lens has been used by leading filmmakers including Steven Spielberg, James Cameron and in television commercials. In October 1998, Jim was presented with the John Grierson International Gold Medal  for pioneering work in micro/macro cinematography of invertebrate animals leading to the design of the Frazier lens System.

Frazier also worked on a lens that promised to have a similar impact, being simpler and needing much less light. He also designed and tested 3D capture using a single lens.

He also created crystal artworks, that were developed through the growth and manipulation of crystals on glass plates.  The crystals are shaped with the use of sound tones, energy fields and heat to make brilliant compositions and captured by special photographic techniques. They are featured in private collections around the world including those of Oprah Winfrey and Hillary Clinton.

Frazier died on 17 September 2022, at the age of 81.

References

External links
Jim Frazier at the Encyclopedia of Australian Science
Jim Frazier - profile at Focus Australia

1940 births
2022 deaths
Australian cinematographers
People from Armidale
Academy Award for Technical Achievement winners
Recipients of the Medal of the Order of Australia